The deep circumflex iliac vein is formed by the union of the venae comitantes of the deep iliac circumflex artery, and joins the external iliac vein about 2 cm. above the inguinal ligament.  It also receives small tributary branches from the thoracoepigastric vein

References

Veins of the torso